March 2018 nor'easter may refer to any of four nor'easters that affected the East Coast of the United States in March 2018:
March 1–3, 2018 nor'easter
March 6–8, 2018 nor'easter
March 12–14, 2018 nor'easter
March 20–22, 2018 nor'easter